This is an incomplete list of the 2020 Women's March events in January, most of which took place on January 18, and some on January 19 or later (as noted).


United States 

Listed below are the marches in the U.S.

Worldwide 

Listed below are marches outside the United States in support of the 2020 Women's March.

References

External links 

2020 in Africa
2020 in American politics
2020 in Asia
2020 in Europe
2020 in North America
2020 in Oceania
2020 in women's history
2020 protests
2020-related lists
Feminism-related lists
Foreign relations of the United States
Gatherings of women
History of women's rights
Human rights-related lists
January 2020 events
Lists of places
Protest marches
Protests against Donald Trump
Reactions to the election of Donald Trump
List of 2020 Women's March locations
Women's marches
January 2020 events in India
Protests in India